Tadeusz Faliszewski (born 1898 in Żywiec, died 1961 in Chicago) (also known under his scenic names: Jerzy Nowogródzki, Jerzy Orowski, Jan Pobóg, Jan Saskowski), Polish singer, cabaret actor, director of revues and operettas. Husband of actress Halina Kidawska. Spent his childhood in Lwów (now Lviv, Ukraine). Served in the polish army during the World War I and World War II. Since 1940, he was imprisoned in the Nazi German concentration camp of Gusen.

Made his debut as an actor in 1922, played in Cracow, Radom, Kalisz, and Czestochowa. He and Adam Aston, Henryk Wars and Stefan Sas-Jaworski were the Chór Warsa. Performed in Warsaw cabarets like Morskie Oko and Nowy Ananas, later founded his own literary cabaret Rajski Ptak.

In a 1937 Polish radio contest for vocalists he came in third after Mieczyslaw Fogg and Stefan Witas. He sang many songs with texts by Andrzej Włast.

He starred in the Konrad Tom film Parada Warszawy in 1937, and with Eugeniusz Bodo in 1938 film Królowej przedmieścia.

Though Faliszewski mostly performed and recorded in Polish, there is at least one recording of him singing in Yiddish: A mamenyu is the A side with Rivkele (the Yiddish version of the famous tango Rebeka) on the B side.

External links
  music Jerzy Petersburski lyrics Andrzej Włast
  From movie Co mój mąż robi w nocy? (What Does My Husband Do at Night?)  music by Jerzy Petersburski lyrics Emanuel Schlechter
  Music by Władysław Dan, lyrics Julian Tuwim.
 
 Tadeusz Faliszewski biography on Culture.pl

References

Polish cabaret performers
1898 births
1961 deaths
20th-century comedians